Khanlar Qeshlaqi-ye Hajj Alam Qoli (also Romanized as Khānlar Qeshlāqī-ye Ḩājj Alam Qolī; also known as Khānlar Qeshlāqī and Khānlar Qeshlāqī-ye ‘Olyā) is a village in Aslan Duz Rural District, Aslan Duz District, Parsabad County, Ardabil Province, Iran. At the 2006 census, its population was 242, in 42 families.

References 

Towns and villages in Parsabad County